Doll Museum may refer to one of the following:

 Doll Asylum, an annual Halloween experience and makeshift doll-themed museum, in Portland, Oregon, United States
 Museum of Lifestyle & Fashion History, Palm Beach County, Florida, United States
 Rosalie Whyel Museum of Doll Art, Bellevue, Washington, United States